The 1979–80 Michigan State Spartans men's basketball team represented Michigan State University in the 1980–81 NCAA Division I men's basketball season. The team played their home games at Jenison Field House in East Lansing, Michigan and were members of the Big Ten Conference. They were coached by Jud Heathcote in his fourth year at Michigan State. The Spartans finished the season 12–15, 6–12 in Big Ten play to finish in ninth place in conference.

Previous season
The Spartans finished the 1978–79 season 26–6, 13–5 in Big Ten play to win the Big Ten and ranked No. 3 in the country. The Spartans received a No. 2 seed in the Mideast of the NCAA Tournament. MSU defeated Lamar, Louisiana State, and Notre Dame to advance to the Final Four. In the Final Four, they defeated Penn by 34 points to face overall No. 1 Indiana State. The Spartans won the National Championship as Magic Johnson led MSU over Larry Bird and the Sycamores.

Roster and statistics 

Source

Schedule and results

|-
!colspan=9 style=| Non-conference regular season

|-
!colspan=9 style=|Big Ten regular season

Awards and honors
 Jay Vincent – All-Big Ten First Team
 Jay Vincent – Big Ten Scoring Champion (22.1 ppg in-conference)

See also
 1980 in Michigan

References

Michigan State Spartans men's basketball seasons
Michigan State
Michigan State Spartans men's b
Michigan